The Castaways of the Flag (lit. Second Fatherland, 1900) is an adventure novel written by Jules Verne. The two volumes of the novel were initially published in English translation as two separate volumes: Their Island Home and The Castaways of the Flag. Later reprints were published as The Castaways of the Flag.

The story is a sequel to the 1812 book The Swiss Family Robinson by Johann Wyss, picking up where that novel leaves off.

Publication history
May 1923, Their Island Home and The Castaways of the Flag, London: Sampson Low

Plot summary

Bibliography

 Title	''The Castaways of the Flag: The Final Adventures of the Swiss Family Robinson
 Authors	Jules Verne, Johann David Wyss
 Editor	S. Low, Marston, 1923
 242 pages

External links

 
 Seconde patrie available at Jules Verne Collection 

1900 French novels
French adventure novels
Novels by Jules Verne
The Swiss Family Robinson
Novels set on islands
Sequel novels
Novels set in the Indian Ocean
French novels adapted into films
Nautical novels
Castaways in fiction